The Ochrolechiaceae are a family of lichenized fungi in the order Pertusariales.

References

Pertusariales
Lichen families
Lecanoromycetes families